Nectin-3, also known as nectin cell adhesion molecule 3, is a protein that in humans is encoded by the NECTIN3 gene.

Nectin-3 belongs to the family of immunoglobulin(Ig)-like cellular adhesion molecules involved in Ca2+-independent cellular adhesion in several tissues during the development  and was firstly isolated at the turn of 20th and 21st century.

Structure and localization 
Nectin-3 has three splicing variants, nectin-3α, which is the biggest one, nectin-3β and the smallest variant nectin-3γ.

Nectin-3α (same as the other splicing variants) is abundately expressed in testis, on slightly level it is also expressed in heart, brain, liver or kidney. It has been also proved that nectin-3α is together with nectin-2 localize at the junctional complex regions in small intestina absorptive epitelia. Nectin-3γ is also detectable in lung, liver and kidney. Nectin-3 is expressed not only on epithelial cells as another nectins, but there was shown that, as the only member of nectin family, it is expressed also on T- lymphocytes.

The structural properties of nectin-3α is similar to nectin-1, it has three Ig-like domains at the extracellular region and the C-terminal conserved motif at the cytoplasmic region. The homology of aa (amino aci)) of extracellular domains between Nectin-1 and Nectin-3α is 35,9%. Another splicing variants vary in the number of aa, molecular weight and the structural properties. All of them have the identical extracellular region. Nectin-3β and nectin-3γ have the same transmembrane and cytoplasmic regions, which vary from nectin-3α. Nectin-3γ lack of C-terminal domain. With the intracellular domain nectins bind their  assosicated adaptor protein afadin  which plays role in the formation of variety of cell-cell junctions. Nectin-3γ in not able to bind afadin due to lacking C-terminal domain.

All nectins are able to form cis-homo dimer interactions, which simply means they can create dimer of two alike molecules on the same cell membrane. Further, nectin-3α can also interact with Nectin-1/2α in so called trans-hetero interaction.

Function 
Most of the publications deal with nectin-3 regardless the splicing variants, thus this page follows this concept.

Role in neural system 
Nectin-3 is expressed by granule cells in dentate gyrus and the expression levels are developmentally regulated and reduced by early postnatal stress. On mice model, it has been shown that the early-life stress impaires the long-term spatial memory and temporal order memory. It is also very probable that the nectin-3 in dentate gyrus neurons modulate adult neurogenesis and dendritic spine plasticity. It has been proven that combination nectin-3/nectin-1 is very important in formation of synapses in brain, hippocampus and that the formation of hetero-trans-dimers between nectin-1 and nectin-3 determines the position and size of the synapses, in vitro. In vivo, it has been shown that the function of nectin-3 is crutial during the critical periods of the visual cortex development and that it is important not only for synapses formation but also for the synaptic refinement. Also it has been proven that there is a high importance of nectin-3 for the dendritic spine densities (which simply represent the sites of synaptic contacts) on visual cortical neurons. The nectin-1/nectin-3 trans-interaction has been shown to be very important to establishing the adhesion between the pigment and non-pigment cell layers of the ciliary epithelia, which is essential for the morphogenesis of the ciliary body of the eye.

Role in gametogenesis 
Nectin-3 is important role player in spermatid development. The nectin-3–/– male mice were found to have defects in the later steps of sperm morphogenesis, exhibiting distorted nuclei and abnormal distribution of mitochondria. The loss of nectin-3 in male mice leads to male-specific infertility. It has been shown that the chronic stress negatively influences the amnout of nectin-3 in the testis and also the male spermatogenesis function.

Role in transendothelial migration 
As mentioned above, nectin-3 is the only nectin which is expressed on T- lymphocytes. The interaction between nectin-3 on T-cells and other nectins on epithelial cells is very important in the lymphocyte transendothelial migration, in vitro. It has been shown that this process is dependent on nectin-2, which is expressed on epithelial cells, the blockation of nectin-2 or nectin-3 leads to inhibition of lymphocyte and also monocyte extravasation.

Nectin-3 in cancer 
Nectin-3 is highly expressed in epithelial cancer cells of human lung adenocarcinoma. It is expressed in 80% of patients which makes it relatively strong prognostic marker. It has been shown, there are various expression patterns of nectin-3; cytoplasmic, membranous or combined. The membranous expression is connected with significantly poorer prognosis, patients with this type of expression pattern are also more likely to earlier relapse and death. Increased amounts of nectin-3 are also detectable in ovaries during the ovarian cancer and are correlated with poor patient prognosis. The data also suggest that the possible mechanism of nectin-3 in cellular invasion and migration is by upregulating the expression of matrix metalloproteinases (MMPs) MMP2 and MMP9 in ovarian cancer.

Contrary to previously mentioned cancers, the amount of nectin-3 negatively correlates with  Pancreatic neuroendocrine tumors. The loss of this protein correlates with increased tumor progressiveness.

Interactions 

Nectin-3 has been shown to interact with:
 MLLT4, 
 PARD3,
 PTPRM.

References 

Cell adhesion molecules
Clusters of differentiation